Dmytro Ihorovych Shurov (born 31 October 1981) is a Ukrainian pianist, composer, and singer-songwriter based in Kyiv. He was also a judge on the Ukrainian X-Factor for the eighth and ninth seasons. He was also the infamous judge to destroy a contestant's guitar that was given to him by his father whom had passed earlier.

Early life 
Shurov was born on 31 October 1981 in Vinnytsia. His father, Ihor, is a poet and painter, and his mother is a teacher and musician. Dmytro started playing the piano at four years old.

Shurov studied in lyceum Auguste Renoir in Limoges, France and in Utah, United States where he sang in the choir and played in the jazz band and the orchestra, which performed compositions of the Baroque period; he also played in the quartet "Barbershop". After coming back from the U.S., Shurov applied to Kyiv National Linguistic University.

Career

Shurov joined Okean Elzy as a session member in 2000. Later in 2001, he became part of the band and gained popularity alongside the increasingly popular band. In 2004, Shurov left the band to join a newly formed band, Esthetic Education, with another member of Okean Elzy, bass player Yuriy Khustochka. Esthetic Education remained active until 2008. In 2009, Shurov started his own project called "Pianoбой".

Shurov was a co-organizer of Kyiv's festival Moloko Music Fest in 2008 and 2009 as a part of Gogolfest. He composed music for films, including "Khottabych", television series "Servant of the People", as well as for comedy and fashion shows. He is a brand ambassador of Yamaha in Ukraine.

Controversy 
In April 2021, Shurov faced public backlash and controversy for his destruction of a contestant's guitar whilst he was employed as a Season 8 and 9 Judge on the Ukraine X-Factor. Shurov had smashed the guitar as a response to not liking the contestant's song and melodies. It was later revealed that the contestant had received the guitar from his late-father.

Personal life 
Shurov married Olha Tarakanovska in 2002. On 23 August 2003, Olha gave a birth to a son. The family lives in Kyiv.

Discography

Awards and nominations

References

External resources 
 
 Esthetic Education, Киевский Рок Клуб
 

1981 births
Ukrainian pianists
Ukrainian rock musicians
Living people
21st-century Ukrainian male singers
Ukrainian LGBT rights activists